The Thomas Woodard, Jr. Farm is a historic farmhouse in Cedar Hill, Tennessee, U.S.

History
The farmhouse was built circa 1838 for Thomas Woodard, Jr. of Woodard Hall, his wife Winnefred House Robertson, and their children. Woodard owned distilled whiskey and grew tobacco.

Woodard owned slaves who worked on the farm. By 1860, he owned 14. After the American Civil War of 1861–1865, most of his former slaves, who took the last name Woodard, became tenant farmers. Both slaves and tenant farmers were buried in a cemetery on the property.

The farm remained in the Woodard family until 1921, when it continued to be used to grow tobacco. It is now a horse farm.

Architectural significance
The house was designed in the Federal architectural style. It has been listed on the National Register of Historic Places since April 8, 2008.

References

Houses on the National Register of Historic Places in Tennessee
Federal architecture in Tennessee
Houses completed in 1838
National Register of Historic Places in Robertson County, Tennessee